Averse Sefira was a black metal band from Austin, Texas.

Biography 
Averse Sefira was formed in 1996 by guitarist and vocalist Sanguine Mapsama and bassist Wrath Sathariel Diabolus. Their demo, Blasphomet Sin Abset, was released later that year. It featured a drum machine in lieu of a live drummer. Three years later, in 1999, their first full-length album, which was entitled Homecomings March, was released on Arrogare Records, their own label which was created specifically for the purpose of releasing that album. Again, the band had to make use of a drum machine instead of a real drummer. A remastered version of the album was released in 2003, with the interludes as separate tracks.

2001 had the band releasing a second album, Battle's Clarion. For this album, the band, for the first time, had a live drummer, The Carcass, who was previously a member of Texas death metal band Death of Millions, and was, at one point, a touring drummer for Incantation. The music on this album took on a profound death metal influence, at times reminiscent of early Deicide or Morbid Angel, but was still easily identifiable as black metal.

After Battle's Clarion, the band toured internationally for a few years intermittently, both with well-known bands such as Dark Funeral and underground acts such as 
Antaeus and Watain. The band quickly gained a reputation for putting on a fierce live show and gained followings in Europe and South America, particularly in Brazil.

Four years after Battle's Clarion, in 2005, the band returned to the studio to record their third full-length album, Tetragrammatical Astygmata. For the first time, the band had a powerful production, provided by Necromorbus Studio. This album saw the band continuing both in the more sonorous direction employed on Homecomings March and the chaotic direction first seen on Battle's Clarion. A newly found sense of harmonics, similar to Immortal's Pure Holocaust, aided in the creation of the band's sound as well as connecting it to the contemplative moments. Interludes on this album were more limited than on any prior work, occasionally making a brief appearance to connect two songs.

Advent Parallax was issued on February 25 by Candlelight Records. And again it was produced by Tore Stjerna (Necromorbus).

In a blog post on May 3, 2012 Averse Sefira announced the band had come to an end.  "It is over. The entity Averse Sefira has fractured back into its earthly parts, never to take wing again."

Musical style and ideology 
The band's early music was "stylistically most like early Mayhem and Gorgoroth". Around Battle's Clarion, they "explored a more death-oriented sound, and helped mold the style of the Texas outfit into something a bit more developed". On Advent Parallax, Averse Sefira "provide raw, scorching, bludgeoning black metal" with "hints of death metal on occasion, but black metal is the main ingredient -- and that means sinister-sounding rasp vocals […], thunderous blastbeats, and an ambience of total doom. One of the things that makes Advent Parallax effective is the fact that you can actually understand the lyrics that are coming out of Mapsama's mouth. So many black metal and death metal vocalists are difficult to understand, but Mapsama is quite understandable on pummeling tracks such as 'Viral Kinesis,' 'Serpent Recoil,' 'Cognition of Rebirth,' and 'Seance in a Warrior's Memory.' All things considered, this early-2008 release is a respectable, noteworthy example of an American band with a very Scandinavian-influenced sound" wrote Alex Henderson for AllMusic.

Sanguine has stated that as a Satanist, he finds it "somewhat insulting to see bands who write lyrics where every other word is 'SATAN!'", and Wrath Sathariel Diabolus disassociated himself from US death metal bands believing themselves to be black metallers because they use corpse paint and scream "Satan", pointing out that behind black metal, there is an idea first and not just strongly distorted guitars. Wrath named John Milton's Paradise Lost as a "great piece of literature" he gets inspiration from. He is also inspired by some magical, "particularly ones dealing with Enochian magick", and the Old Testament, "only because it portrays god and the angels as destructive and terrifying. I like that." Sanguine is inspired by the works of Arthur Edward Waite, William Blake and Charles Baudelaire. Referring to the 1990s NSBM trend, Wrath pointed out that Averse Sefira never had any link with Nazism; and Sanguine sees "it as somewhat contradictory that people are linking national-socialism and satanism together, although it seems that most of the NS bands are dumping their Satanic roots. Adopting National-Socialism seems like a last ditch shock tactic."

Discography

Studio releases 
 Homecoming's March - (1999)
 Battle's Clarion - (2001)
 Tetragrammatical Astygmata - (2005)
 Advent Parallax - (2008)

Live and compilation releases 
 A Union in Blood - Live in Bordeaux (live, 2003)
 Bestien in Engelgestalt (split w/ Secrets of the Moon, 2003)

Demos and bootlegs 
 Blasphomet Sin Abset (demo, 1996)
 Promotional Demo 1999 (demo, 1999)

Band members

Current members 
 Sanguine Mapsama - guitar, vocals
 Wrath Sathariel Diabolus - bass, backing vocals
 The Carcass - drums
 Lady of the Evening Faces - effects, "interludes", keyboards

Former members 
 "Nuclear" Gregg Garbach - drums (1999–2000)

References

External links 
 Official site
 
 Averse Sefira at Discogs

Musical groups from Austin, Texas
American black metal musical groups
Musical groups established in 1996
Heavy metal musical groups from Texas
American musical trios
1996 establishments in Texas
Candlelight Records artists